Charlottenberg Station is a railway station located on the Kongsvinger Line and the Värmland Line at Charlottenberg in Eda, Sweden.

References

Railway stations in Värmland County
Railway stations on the Kongsvinger Line
Railway stations opened in 1865
Norway–Sweden border crossings
1862 establishments in Sweden